A black mecca, in the United States, is a city to which African Americans, particularly singles, professionals, and middle-class families, are drawn to live, due to some or all of the following factors:

 superior economic opportunities for black people, often as assessed by the presence of a large black upper-middle and upper class
 black businesses and political power in a city
 leading black educational institutions in a city
 a city's leading role in black history, arts, music, food, and other cultures
 harmonious black-white race relations in a city

New York City, in particular Harlem, was referred to as a black mecca during the Harlem Renaissance of the 1920s, 1930s, 1940s and still is today. Atlanta has also adopted the name and has been referred to as a black mecca since the 1970s, while Black Enterprise has referred to Houston as the emerging equivalent.

Atlanta 

Atlanta has been widely noted as a black mecca since the 1970s.

In 1971, Ebony magazine called Atlanta the "black mecca of the South", because "black folks have more, live better, accomplish more and deal with whites more effectively than they do anywhere else in the South—or North". Ebony illustrated as evidence of "mecca" status Atlanta's high black home ownership, the Atlanta University Center (the nation's largest consortium of historically black colleges (HBCUs)), Atlanta's civil rights heritage, black business ownership, black-owned restaurants, the civic leadership of the black clergy, black fraternal organizations, and black political power in City Hall, while it also acknowledged the poverty which a large percentage of Atlanta's black population endured.

In 1974, Atlanta became the first major southern city to elect an African American mayor.  Since 1974, every Atlanta mayor has been African American and mostly graduates of HBCUs.

In 1983, Atlanta magazine said that Atlanta's reputation as a black mecca was "deserved because it is true" because "the metro area now has the highest proportion of middle-income African-Americans of any city in the country".
A 1997 Ebony magazine article illustrated Atlanta's status as "the new mecca" (and the "land of milk and honey" for blacks) because a poll of the magazine's 100 most influential African Americans voted Atlanta overall the best city for blacks, possessed the most employment opportunities for blacks, it was American's "most diverse city", and was the city with the best schools and most affordable housing for blacks. A 2002 article in the same magazine reconfirmed Atlanta as "the new black mecca" and "the go-to city for blacks."

In 2009, the Associated Press characterized Atlanta's status as a black mecca by black political power in its City Hall.

A 2015 report showed that the Atlanta area had the greatest numerical gain in new black residents than any metropolitan area in the U.S., according to an analysis of census data.

In 2018, Forbes magazine ranked Atlanta tied for the #1 city in the U.S. (along with the Washington, D.C. area) for where African-Americans are doing the best economically.

In 2019, USA Today named Atlanta the nation's black tech capital.  Atlanta attracts the most black professionals in the tech industry.

The black proportion of the city's population shrank to 46.7% in 2020 from 54.0% in 2010, but as of 2020, the Atlanta City Council remains majority black which is rare for city councils in major U.S. cities.

Historically Black colleges in Atlanta 

Atlanta is the home of the oldest and largest consortium of historically black institutions in the nation.  The Atlanta University Center consists of Clark Atlanta University, Spelman College, Morehouse College and the Morehouse School of Medicine. The consortium structure allows for students to cross-register at the other institutions in order to attain a broader collegiate experience.

The first college founded by African-Americans in Georgia, Morris Brown College, is based in Atlanta.

The Atlanta Student Movement was an organization formed in the 1960s by students enrolled in Atlanta's historically black colleges that focused on dismantling systematic racism and oppression of African-Americans.  Their courageous efforts led to fairer treatment and better opportunities for African-Americans in the Atlanta area.

Black educational attainment
According to a 2018 study, 30.7% of blacks in the Atlanta metro area have earned at least a bachelor's degree which is above the national black average of 21.8%.

Black entertainment mecca 

In 2011 in a New York Times article with the short title "Atlanta Emerges as a Black Entertainment Mecca", comedian Cedric the Entertainer, who hosted that year's Soul Train Music Awards, said Atlanta had always been a black mecca and continues to be one, with respect to the black musical talent in the city.

In 2019, Tyler Perry opened the 330-acre Tyler Perry Studios which is the largest film production studio in the nation and the first major film production studio owned by an African-American.

Black entrepreneurship 

According to a 2015 study by NerdWallet, the Atlanta area is home to about 2.1 million black owned businesses which is the highest in the nation.

Established in 2005, the Atlanta Black Chamber of Commerce is dedicated to supporting and connecting black entrepreneurs in the Atlanta area. Established in 2019, Atlanta's Russell Center for Innovation & Entrepreneurship is America's largest center dedicated to empowering black entrepreneurs and small businesses.

Black home ownership
In 2020, Atlanta's black home ownership rate was 48.7% which was higher than the national black home ownership average of 44.1%.  The metro Atlanta home ownership rate was 48.1% which was also higher than the national black home ownership average.

Mecca for Black LGBT people

In 2005, The New York Times reported that Atlanta had become a mecca for LGBT blacks, noting that within the African-American community in the U.S., in which being gay was slightly less accepted than in society as a whole, Atlanta formed a reputation for being a progressive place of tolerance with its "too busy to hate" mantra. Atlanta is also widely noted for its annual Atlanta Black Pride celebration. An earlier 2004 article in the Atlanta Journal-Constitution also documented Atlanta as a "hub" or "mecca" for black gays.

Criticism 

Atlanta's status as a "mecca" for blacks is sometimes questioned, or the concept of a "mecca" refuted altogether, due to the endemic high levels of black poverty that exist alongside black success. In 1997 the Chicago Tribune published an article titled "Atlanta's image as a black mecca losing luster". The loss in "luster" was because of a reality that too many blacks weren't coming close to financial success, but rather "caught up in a vicious cycle of poverty, crime and homelessness". The city had among the highest crime rates in the nation, some inner-city blacks were unable to travel to jobs in the suburbs, and despite 20 years of black city leadership, the reality was those city officials were unable to solve these systemic problems.

Harlem

Harlem renaissance 

Harlem in New York City was widely noted as a black mecca during the 1920s and 1930s.
In March 1925 the leading magazine Survey Graphic produced an issue entitled "Harlem: Mecca of the New Negro" that was devoted to the African-American literary and artistic movement now known as the "Harlem Renaissance". Alain Locke guest-edited this issue. Much of the material appears in his 1925 anthology "The New Negro." In 1965, author Seth Scheiner published the book Negro Mecca; A History of the Negro in New York City, 1865-1920.

The 2001 book Harlemworld documented that the concept of Harlem as a black mecca at that time (i.e. seven decades after the Harlem Renaissance) was still present among many residents - a concept that was "history-laden" or even quasi-mythical.

Mecca for West African Muslim immigrants 

Black Mecca: The African Muslims of Harlem was also the title of a 2010 book by Temple University professor Zain Abdullah about Muslim West African immigrants in New York City, using "Mecca" not only in the generic sense of "a place that people are drawn to" but also playing on the original meaning of Mecca as the Muslim holy city.

Houston 

In 2016, Black Enterprise called Houston the South’s "next great Black business Mecca". The Houston metropolitan area boasts an accomplished and strategically networked community of African American entrepreneurs, executives, and business leaders as any city in the country. Houston also claims one of the most robust and effective business development and advocacy organizations in the country. The Greater Houston Black Chamber of Commerce, founded in 1935 as Houston's first black civic organization and currently led by Chairwoman Courtney Johnson Rose, is the go-to source for business development and strategic partnership opportunities, as well as education, capital, and contacts for entrepreneurs. Mayor Sylvester Turner, the city's second and current black mayor (elected in 2016). It is worth noting that it was during the mayoral term of Lee Brown (1998-2004), Houston's first African American mayor, that the city was named No. 1 on Black Enterprise's list of Top Cities for African Americans to Live, Work, and Play, edging out perennial black business meccas, including Atlanta, Harlem, and Washington, D.C. Houston has long been known as a popular destination for Black and African Americans due to the city's well-established and influential Black or African American community.  The Houston area is home to the largest African American community west of the Mississippi River.

Historically Black colleges in Houston 

The Houston area is the only metropolitan area in the nation to have more than one HBCU with over 8,000 enrolled students. Texas Southern University is one of the largest and most comprehensive HBCUs in the nation. Prairie View A&M University, based circa 30 miles northwest of Houston, is also one of the largest HBCUs in the nation and the second oldest public university in the state.

Houston's first Sit-in on March 4, 1960 was organized and led by Texas Southern University students.  The Sit-in eventually led to normalizing desegregation of Houston businesses.

Black educational attainment
According to a 2018 study, 27.5% of blacks in the Houston metro area have earned at least a bachelor's degree which is above the national black average of 21.8%.

Houston hip hop
The Houston hip hop scene is highly influential and has a unique sound that is recognized worldwide.  In particular, chopped and screwed created by DJ Screw in the 1990s, is a staple in Houston's hip-hop scene.  Megan Thee Stallion, Travis Scott, Bun B, Slim Thug, Kirko Bangz, Z-Ro, Pimp C, and Geto Boys are some popular hip-hop artists from Houston.  Drake, one of the world's best selling music artists, stated he was highly influenced by Houston's black culture and music.   In 2008, former Houston mayor Annise Parker declared June 10th Drake Day in Houston for his promotion and support of the city.

Black entrepreneurship 

Houston is ranked as one of the best U.S. cities for Black professional growth and achievement. Houston is home to a number of successful entrepreneurs and established Black owned businesses that contribute to the thriving economy of the city. The only Black-owned bank in Texas, Unity National Bank, is based in Houston.  The Greater Houston Black Chamber (GHBC) is a notable forum in Houston that provides a collaborative network of African-American owned businesses, entrepreneurs, and professionals.

Mecca for Nigerian immigrants 

A significant number of African immigrants call Houston home. In addition, Houston has the largest Nigerian immigrant population in the U.S. with many of these Nigerians being highly educated and holding postgraduate degrees. The Houston area has many African-owned stores and supermarkets.

Other U.S. cities and statistics 

Only Atlanta, Chicago, Harlem, Houston, and Washington, D.C., are, over time and in multiple sources, mentioned as black meccas.

Comparison of black-majority cities at the time of the 2010 US Census:

Canadian cities 

In the 1850s, the city of Chatham, Ontario was referred to as the "Black Mecca of Canada", as a final stop on the Underground Railroad. A museum in the city, the Black Mecca Museum, still bears this name. The small city was home to a number of black churches and business, with Black Canadians making up 1/3 of the city's population and controlling a significant portion of the city's political power. Nearby Dresden and Buxton were home to thousands of land-owning black residents. The 2021 documentary, The North Star: Finding Black Mecca explores this chapter of Chatham's history.

References 

City nicknames
African-American culture
African-American demographics
Cities in the United States
Culture of Atlanta
Culture of Houston
Harlem